Power of Soul is an album by Idris Muhammad.

Track listing
All compositions arranged and conducted by Bob James

Reception

Thom Jurek of AllMusic gave the record 5 out of 5 stars, saying that the album "..is one of the reasons that Idris Muhammad is regarded as the drumming king of groove".

Personnel
 Idris Muhammad – drums
 Randy Brecker – trumpet, flugelhorn
 Grover Washington Jr. – tenor and soprano saxophone
 Bob James – Fender Rhodes, keyboards
 Joe Beck – guitar
 Gary King – bass
 Ralph MacDonald – percussion

References

Idris Muhammad albums
1974 albums
Kudu Records albums
Albums recorded at Van Gelder Studio
Albums produced by Creed Taylor